Weatherald is a surname. Notable people with the surname include:

Jake Weatherald (born 1994), Australian cricketer
Thomas Milton Weatherald (1937–2019), Canadian politician
Tim Weatherald (born 1977), Australian rules footballer